The 2016 FIBA Asia Champions Cup was the 25th staging of the FIBA Asia Champions Cup, the international basketball club tournament of FIBA Asia. The tournament took place in Chenzhou, China from 8 October to 16 October, 2016. The venue of the tournament was Chenzhou Olympic Sports Centre Gymnasium. This was the return of the tournament after a two-year hiatus since the 2013 edition.

Xinjiang Flying Tigers from China, which used the name 'China Kashgar' during this tournament, won its first ever FIBA Asia Champions Cup title in its tournament debut. After going undefeated in the entire tournament, Xinjiang defeated Al-Riyadi from Lebanon in the final game, 96–88. It was the fourth time a club from China has won the championship.

Qualification
According to the FIBA Asia rules, the number of participating teams in the FIBA Asia Champions Cup is ten. Each of the six FIBA Asia Sub-Zones has one place, and the hosts (China) was automatically qualified. The other three places are allocated to the zones according to performance in the 2013 FIBA Asia Champions Cup.

* The third place of East Asia subzone is reallocated to West Asia subzone.

According to the Basketball Federation of India's official website, the 30th Federation National Basketball Championship served as the qualifying tournament for the FIBA Asia Champions Cup, wherein the champion team will qualify to represent South Asia.  On March 14, 2016, ONGC defeated IOB in the finals to win the championship and the right to represent South Asia subzone to the FIBA Asia Champions Cup.

On March 27, 2016, the Westports Malaysia Dragons clinched a berth to the 2016 FIBA Asia Champions Cup by winning the ASEAN Basketball League crown against rivals Singapore Slingers in a best of 5 Finals series.

Preliminary round
The draw was held in the host city Chenzhou on 1 September 2016.

All times are local (UTC+8).

Group A

Group B

Final round

Quarterfinals

Classification 5th–8th

Semifinals

Seventh place game

Fifth place game

Third place game

Final

Final ranking

Awards

All-Star Five

References

2016
Champions Cup
Champions Cup
International basketball competitions hosted by China
October 2016 sports events in Asia